Francesco Di Tacchio (born 20 April 1990) is an Italian professional footballer who plays as a defensive midfielder for Serie B club Ternana.

Club career
Di Tacchio played his first Serie B match on 28 February 2009 against Avellino.
In June 2009, was signed by Fiorentina, and Arturo Lupoli joined the opposite direction. Both clubs jointly contracted with both players. On 19 August 2010, he moved on loan to Frosinone. On 11 July 2011, he moved on loan to Juve Stabia. On 18 August 2012, he moved on loan to Perugia. On 31 January 2013, he moved on loan with option of full redemption to Virtus Entella.
On 27 June Di Tacchio signed for Virtus Entella in a permanent transfer.

On 9 August 2018, he signed a three-year contract with Serie B club Salernitana.

On 28 June 2022, Di Tacchio moved to Ternana in Serie B on a three-year deal.

International career
Di Tacchio was capped for Italy U20 team at 2009 Mediterranean Games.

References

External links
figc.it
aic.football.it

1990 births
People from Trani
Footballers from Apulia
Living people
Italian footballers
Italy youth international footballers
Ascoli Calcio 1898 F.C. players
ACF Fiorentina players
Frosinone Calcio players
S.S. Juve Stabia players
Virtus Entella players
Pisa S.C. players
U.S. Avellino 1912 players
U.S. Salernitana 1919 players
Ternana Calcio players
Serie A players
Serie B players
Serie C players
Association football midfielders
Mediterranean Games silver medalists for Italy
Mediterranean Games medalists in football
Competitors at the 2009 Mediterranean Games
Sportspeople from the Province of Barletta-Andria-Trani